Verkhny Zub is a peak in Kemerovo Oblast, Russia. It is the highest point of the federal subject.

The name of the mountain in the Khakas language "Тигір тізі" means "heavenly tooth". The mountain is part of the Kuznetsk Alatau State Nature Reserve, a protected area.

Description
It rises in the southern area of the range, in the Mezhdurechensky Urban Okrug at the eastern limit of Kemerovo Oblast, near the border of Khakassia. 

At the foot of the mountain there are numerous cirque lakes. Dark coniferous taiga grows on the lower mountain slopes. On steep slopes up to a height of  there is mountain tundra, above which there is the nival zone with snowfields at the top.

See also
 Highest points of Russian Federal subjects
 List of mountains and hills of Russia

References

External links
Вершина Верхний зуб. Кузнецкий Алатау. Горный массив на юге Западной Сибири. Кемеровская область, Хакасия
Гора Верхний Зуб (2178 м) Wikimapia

Verkhny Zub
Landforms of Kemerovo Oblast